The Accokeek were a group of Native Americans living in Southern Maryland at the time of English colonization. They lived along the Potomac River in present-day Prince George's County, Maryland. They were an Algonquian-language tribe and were related to the Piscataway, another Algonquian-language tribe.

Accokeek, Maryland, a small unincorporated town in Maryland, was named after the Accokeek tribe.

Accokeek means "at the edge of the hill".

Sources
The prehistoric people of Accokeek Creek, p. 25

References

External links
The First Marylanders 
Delaware CREP page

Algonquian peoples
Extinct Native American tribes
Native American tribes in Maryland